Sir Cattamanchi Ramalinga Reddy Educational Institutions (C.R. Reddy Institutions) is the parent body of several institutions including 

 Sir C.R Reddy Public School,
 Sir C.R.Reddy College (Intermediate and Degree)
 Sir C.R.Reddy Polytechnic College
 Sir.C.R.Reddy College Of Pharmaceutical Sciences
 Sir C.R. Reddy College of Engineering 

The Degree college is affiliated to Adikavi Nannaya University. It was established in 1989. Where as Sir C.R Reddy College of Engineering is affiliated to Andhra University up to 2016-2020 batch. From 2017,it is permanently affiliated to Jawaharlal Nehru Technological University, Kakinada.

Programs
The University offers 16 programs at undergraduate, postgraduate and Doctoral levels in Technology, Pharmacy, Science, Engineering (Mechanical Engineering, Civil Engineering, Electrical and Electronics Engineering, Electronics and Communications Engineering, Computer Science Engineering, Information Technology), Management and Law. It also contains a High school and Primary school.

Admissions

Admission to the Engineering College is through the college entrance exam or through EAPCET examination conducted by Andhra Pradesh Government.

References

External links
 Sir C.R Reddy College Official website

Education in Eluru
1945 establishments in India
Colleges affiliated to Andhra University